Kansa Taisteli (Finnish: The People Fought) was a monthly men's magazine which featured articles on the memories of the war veterans. The magazine published in Helsinki, Finland, in the period 1957–1986. It was the Finnish version of Landserheft, a German magazine.

History and profile
Kansa Taisteli was launched in 1957 and published four times a year. From 1958 its frequency became monthly. The magazine was published by Bonnier Publications on a monthly basis. The content of the magazine covered the memories of the soldiers who fought in the wars between Finland and the Soviet Union in the period 1939–1944 during World War II. 

In the first year Kansa Taisteli sold 30,000 copies. The circulation was 80,000 copies in 1967, but became 30,000 copies in 1986 when it ceased publication.

References

1957 establishments in Finland
1986 disestablishments in Finland
Bonnier Group
Defunct magazines published in Finland
Finnish-language magazines
Magazines established in 1957
Magazines disestablished in 1986
Magazines published in Helsinki
Men's magazines published in Finland
Military magazines
Monthly magazines published in Finland
Quarterly magazines published in Finland